Roger Pilon (born November 28, 1942) is Vice President for Legal Affairs for the Cato Institute, and an American libertarian legal theorist. In particular, he has developed a libertarian version of the rights theory of his teacher, noted philosopher Alan Gewirth.

Education
Roger Pilon has three philosophy degrees: a bachelor's degree from Columbia University and a masters and doctorate, both from the University of Chicago. He also earned a law degree at the George Washington University.

General background
Pilon is the publisher of the Cato Supreme Court Review. His writing has appeared in such newspapers as the New York Times, the Washington Post, the Wall Street Journal, and the Los Angeles Times. He also frequently appears on television shows and testifies before Congress. In addition, Pilon held five senior posts in the administration of Ronald Reagan.

He is married to Juliana Geran Pilon.

Interpretation of the U.S. Constitution

Pilon believes that the government only has power to regulate conduct that violates other people's rights. This view is in the tradition of John Locke's view of natural rights. An example of this is the use of contraceptives. Pilon reasons that since people using contraceptives (see Griswold v. Connecticut) were not violating anyone's rights, the state had no authority to regulate such activity. However, Pilon believes abortion is not a constitutionally-protected right. He reasons that everyone, he hopes, would agree that killing a baby one day after it is born is murder. Then, what is the difference between one day after and one day before? The answer is there is no principal difference. Then, what about two months before or three? This sort of line drawing, Pilon reasons, is meant to be left to the political branches.

Pilon believes that Congress should be kept within its enumerated powers. He believes the Supreme Court of the United States has failed to limit Congress with the spending power and the commerce power. He refers to it as the "so-called spending power" because nowhere in the Constitution is it an independent power. Therefore, Congress can spend money only to further its otherwise enumerated powers. One of those powers is the power to regulate commerce among the states, nations, and Indian tribes.

Pilon believes that the court was incorrect in Wickard v. Filburn to assert that Congress can regulate activity that, aggregated together, has a substantial effect on interstate commerce. Pilon reasons that everything has some effect on commerce; therefore, the court's reasoning essentially makes Congress's power unlimited. Pilon states, however, that United States v. Lopez fixed this problem to a small degree, but, then again, Gonzales v. Raich weakened that decision.

Works 

Roger Pilon, A Theory of Rights: Toward Limited Government (unpublished Ph.D. dissertation, University of Chicago, 1979).
Alan Gewirth, Reason and Morality (Chicago: University of Chicago Press, 1978)
Alan Gewirth, "The Basis and Content of Human Rights," Georgia Law Review 13 (1979): 1148)

References

External links
 Pilon's information page on Cato.org
 
Follow Roger Pilon on Twitter

1942 births
Living people
American libertarians
Cato Institute people
Columbia University School of General Studies alumni
Federalist Society members
George Washington University Law School alumni
University of Chicago alumni